Ceroplesis strandi is a species of beetle in the family Cerambycidae. It was described by Breuning in 1935. It is known from Kenya, Malawi, Tanzania and Zambia.

References

strandi
Beetles described in 1935